KhanaPoshtan (also Romanized as Khānā Poshtān; also known as Khān-e Poshtān and Khān Poshtān) is a village in Bibalan Rural District, Kelachay District, Rudsar County, Gilan Province, Iran. At the 2006 census, its population was 564, in 177 families.

References 

Populated places in Rudsar County